Kimberly S. Budd (born October 23, 1966) is the chief justice of the Supreme Judicial Court of Massachusetts and former justice of the Massachusetts Superior Court.

Early life, education and legal career
Kimberly S. Budd was born on October 23,1966 to former U.S. Attorney for the District of Massachusetts Wayne Budd. Budd primarily grew up in Peabody, Massachusetts. She attended Peabody Veterans Memorial High School, but graduated high school in Atlanta after her family moved before the start of her senior year in 1983.

Budd received a bachelor's degree in English from Georgetown University, graduating magna cum laude in 1988, and a J.D. degree from Harvard Law School in 1991. She began her legal career as a law clerk to Chief Justice Joseph P. Warner of the Massachusetts Appeals Court in 1991. She was a litigation associate at Mintz, Levin, Cohn, Ferris, Glovsky and Popeo before serving as an Assistant United States Attorney in the United States Attorney's Office for the District of Massachusetts. After that, she was a university attorney for Harvard University in the General Counsel's Office. She later served as Director of the Community Values program at Harvard Business School.

Judicial career
Budd was previously an Associate Justice for the Massachusetts Superior Court. She was nominated to the court by Governor Deval Patrick in July 2009 and began active service in September 2009. She was nominated to the seat formerly held by Ralph D. Gants.

Massachusetts Supreme Judicial Court
She was nominated to the court by Governor Charlie Baker on June 14, 2016, and confirmed by the Governor's Council on August 10, 2016. She assumed office on August 24, 2016 and was ceremonially sworn in on November 21, 2016.

In May 2017, Budd wrote for the unanimous court when it found that the federal Americans with Disabilities Act required the Massachusetts parole board to make reasonable accommodations when considering whether to grant parole to a murderer with traumatic brain injury.

On October 28, 2020, Governor Charlie Baker nominated Justice Budd to assume the role of Chief Justice of the Supreme Judicial Court. Justice Budd has been nominated to fill the Chief Justice vacancy after the death of former Chief Justice Justice Ralph Gants in September 2020. On November 18, 2020, she was unanimously confirmed by the Governor's Council. Budd became the first female, African-American Chief Justice of the Massachusetts Supreme Judicial Court upon her swearing in.

Teaching
Budd teaches in MCLE and Bar Association programs, is a former adjunct instructor at New England Law, and has taught trial advocacy at Harvard Law School.

Personal life
She is married with two sons. Her father is Wayne Budd currently senior counsel at Goodwin Procter and a former United States Attorney.

References

External links
Official Biography on Supreme Court website

|-

1966 births
Living people
20th-century American women lawyers
20th-century American lawyers
21st-century American judges
21st-century American women judges
African-American judges
Assistant United States Attorneys
Chief Justices of the Massachusetts Supreme Judicial Court
Georgetown College (Georgetown University) alumni
Harvard Law School alumni
Harvard Law School faculty
Massachusetts lawyers
Massachusetts Superior Court justices
Justices of the Massachusetts Supreme Judicial Court
New England Law Boston faculty
Women chief justices of state supreme courts in the United States
American women legal scholars
American legal scholars
American women academics
20th-century African-American women
20th-century African-American people
21st-century African-American women
21st-century African-American people